Jill Barber (born February 6, 1980) is a Canadian singer-songwriter. Originally associated with the folk-pop genre, she has performed vocal jazz and pop music on her more recent albums.

Early life
Barber was born and raised in Port Credit, a neighbourhood in the south-central part of Mississauga, just west of Toronto. Her brother is singer-songwriter Matthew Barber. She studied at Queen's University before pursuing her musical career full time.

Career 
Barber won the Female Artist Recording of the Year award for her debut album Oh Heart at the 2005 Music Nova Scotia Awards. In 2007, Barber earned her fourth win as Best Local Solo Artist (Female) in The Coast’s annual "Best of Music Reader’s Poll", and her first win as Best Canadian Solo Artist (Female).

From February to March 2007, she toured Eastern Canada with Dan Hill as part of Stuart McLean's CBC Radio show The Vinyl Cafe. She returned to the Vinyl Cafe Tour in 2009 performing across Canada with Matt Andersen. In 2008, Barber released Chances, a jazz album with full orchestral arrangements which was partially co-written with her producer Les Cooper, while also collaborating on several songs with Canadian music legend Ron Sexsmith.

This album led to a new level in touring reaching audiences across the globe while earning two Juno Award nominations including New Artist of the Year. The title track to this album was featured on the Netflix series Orange Is the New Black, at the end of season 1, episode 1.

She followed up with the album Mischievous Moon, released through Outside Music in 2011. In the same year, Jill and Matthew Barber collaborated on a cover of The Hardship Post's "Your Sunshine", which appeared on the charity compilation album Have Not Been the Same – Vol. 1: Too Cool to Live, Too Smart to Die.

Barber has performed predominantly in English. She has also recorded and performed "Une femme doit faire" and French translations of two of her songs, "All My Dreams" ("Tous mes rêves") and "Tell Me" ("Dis-moi"). Her 2013 album Chansons, a selection of cover versions of classic songs from Quebec and France, was her first album of material recorded and performed entirely in French.

Barber won the SiriusXM 2012 Jazz Artist of the Year award, as well as the 2013 Western Canadian Francophone Album of the Year for Chansons.

In 2016, Barber co-produced an album The Family Album, with her brother Matthew Barber, also a singer-songwriter. The album consists of original songs written by Jill and Matthew Barber along with covers of songs by Canadian artists, Gene MacClellan Ian Tyson, and Neil Young. The album won a Juno award for Contemporary Roots Album of the year in 2017.

Her solo album, Metaphora, was released in June 2018. She followed up with another French-language album, Entre nous, in 2020, and with Homemaker in 2023.

Author
Barber has written two children's books, Baby's Lullaby and Music is for Everyone.

Charity
Barber is mentor to young women as part of the Girls Action Foundation's Light A Spark initiative, and an ambassador for Save the Children.

Personal life 
Barber is married to CBC Radio 3 personality Grant Lawrence. They have two children.

Discography
2002: A Note to Follow So
2004: Oh Heart
2006: For All Time
2008: Chances
2011: Mischievous Moon
2013: Chansons
2014: Fool's Gold
2016: The Family Album with Matthew Barber
2018: Metaphora
2020: Entre nous
2022: Homemaker

Awards and nominations
2005 East Coast Music Awards
 nominated Female Artist of the Year
 nominated Folk Recording of the Year for the album Oh Heart
2007 East Coast Music Awards
 won Best Album of the Year for the album For All Time
 won Female Artist of the Year
 nominated Folk Recording of the Year
 nominated Songwriter of the Year for the song "Don't Go Easy"
2008 Juno Awards
 nominated New Artist of the Year
2016 Canadian Folk Music Awards
 nominated Producer of the Year
2017 Juno Awards
 won Contemporary Roots Album of the Year for the album The Family Album (shared with Matthew Barber)

References

External links
 
 Jill Barber at Maple Music

1980 births
Living people
Canadian women folk guitarists
Canadian folk guitarists
Canadian women pop singers
Canadian women singer-songwriters
Canadian singer-songwriters
Canadian indie pop musicians
Canadian jazz guitarists
Canadian women jazz singers
French-language singers of Canada
Queen's University at Kingston alumni
Musicians from Halifax, Nova Scotia
Musicians from Mississauga
Musicians from Vancouver
21st-century Canadian guitarists
21st-century Canadian women singers
21st-century women guitarists